A Lethal Dose of American Hatred is the second studio album by American heavy metal band Superjoint Ritual. Former "touring-only" bassist Hank Williams III is featured on this album. Nearly every song begins with a count-in by vocalist Phil Anselmo. "Waiting for the Turning Point" and "Stealing a Page or Two From Armed & Radical Pagans" are finished versions of the two bonus demos released on their first album, Use Once and Destroy. A Lethal Dose of American Hatred was the band's last full-length studio album before disbanding in December 2004. After reforming in October 2014, the album was followed by Caught Up in the Gears of Application in 2016.

Music videos
"Waiting for the Turning Point" and "Dress Like a Target" both had music videos. As considerably short songs, they both found significant airplay on heavy metal programs and consist largely of live performance.

20th Anniversary Reissue
On May 20, 2022, Revolver Magazine respectively reissued the album on a 2LP vinyl cover alongside Superjoint Ritual's first 20th-anniversary album milestone, Use Once and Destroy. The 20th-anniversary edition art covers were designed by Child Bite's lead vocalist, Shawn Knight.

Track listing
 "Sickness" – 3:06
 "Waiting for the Turning Point" – 1:27
 "Dress Like a Target" – 2:46
 "The Destruction of a Person" – 4:26
 "Personal Insult" – 4:12
 "Never to Sit or Stand Again" – 5:14
 "Death Threat" – 2:10
 "Permanently" – 3:24
 "Stealing a Page or Two from Armed and Radical Pagans" – 3:28
 "Symbol of Nevermore" – 5:05
 "The Knife Rises" – 3:51
 "The Horror" – 1:17
 "Absorbed" – 5:45

Personnel
Phil Anselmo – vocals, additional guitars
Kevin Bond – lead guitar
Jimmy Bower – rhythm guitar
Hank Williams III – bass
Joe Fazzio – drums

Chart positions
Album – Billboard (United States)

References

2003 albums
Superjoint albums
Sanctuary Records albums
Albums produced by Dave Fortman